The year 1977 in archaeology involved some significant events.

Excavations
 Mario Pino and Tom Dillehay begins excavations at Monte Verde, Chile
 Excavations of the henge at Balfarg in Scotland, led by Roger Mercer, begin.
 Initial excavations take place at Daepyeong, a large Mumun Pottery Period (c. 1500-300 BC) settlement in Korea.

Finds
 Tomb of Philip II of Macedon with a Vergina Sun is found at Vergina in Greece by Manolis Andronikos.
 Tomb of Marquis Yi of Zeng is found in China.
 The Lion of Al-lāt is found in Palmyra by Polish archeologists.

Publications
 Mark Nathan Cohen - The Food Crisis in Prehistory: Overpopulation and the Origins of Agriculture (New Haven: Yale University Press)
 Bruce Robertson - Aviation Archaeology: a Collector's Guide to Aeronautical Relics (Cambridge, England: Patrick Stephens Ltd).
Stanley South - Method and Theory in Historical Archaeology and Research Strategies in Historical Archaeology (editor)

Events
 Stones at Stonehenge are fenced off to stop vandalism.

Deaths
 George Willmot, British archaeologist and former curator of the Yorkshire Museum (b. 1908)

References

Archaeology
Archaeology
Archaeology by year